Geoffrey Mottram Richards (24 April 1929 – 8 May 2014) was an English professional footballer who played as a winger.

Career
Born in Bilston, Richards played for West Bromwich Albion between 1943 and 1952, making three appearances for them in the Football League. He later played non-league football for Stafford Rangers, Atherstone Town, Bilston Town and Hednesford Town, where he was player-manager.

Later life and death
Richards died on 8 May 2014, at the age of 85.

References

1929 births
2014 deaths
English footballers
English football managers
West Bromwich Albion F.C. players
Stafford Rangers F.C. players
Atherstone Town F.C. players
Bilston Town F.C. players
Hednesford Town F.C. players
English Football League players
Hednesford Town F.C. managers
Association football wingers